The Juno Awards of 2013 honoured Canadian music industry achievements in the latter part of 2011 and in most of 2012. The awards were presented in Regina, Saskatchewan, Canada, during the weekend of 20–21 April 2013. The main ceremony was hosted by Michael Bublé at the Brandt Centre. The city of Moose Jaw also hosted some supporting events.

Events
The Juno Cup charity hockey game was held in Moose Jaw at Mosaic Place.

Most awards were presented at a private gala on 20 April at the Credit Union Eventplex.

Main ceremony performers
The main awards ceremony was held at the Brandt Centre on 21 April and televised on CTV. The following artists were featured during the ceremony:

 Billy Talent with Serena Ryder
 Michael Bublé
 Classified with David Myles
 Hannah Georgas
 Carly Rae Jepsen
 k.d. lang
 Marianas Trench
 Metric
 Serena Ryder
 The Sheepdogs
 The Tenors

Nominees and winners
Nominees were announced on 19 February 2013. Music journalist Larry Leblanc was this year's Walt Grealis Special Achievement Award recipient.

This year's inductee to the Canadian Music Hall of Fame is k.d. lang.

Tom Cochrane was the year's recipient of the Allan Waters Humanitarian Award, based on the musician's significant support for various charities.

Most awards were announced at the private gala on 20 April.

People

Albums

Songs and recordings

Other

Compilation album

Warner Music Canada released a compilation album of songs from the year's Juno nominees on 19 March 2013. Sales of the album support the CARAS music education charity MusiCounts.

References

2013 music awards
2013
Music festivals in Saskatchewan
Culture of Regina, Saskatchewan
2013 in Canadian music
April 2013 events in Canada
2013 in Saskatchewan